Australia participated at the 2017 Summer Universiade, in Taipei, Taiwan with 185 competitors in 16 sports.

Competitors
The following table lists Australia's delegation per sport and gender.

Medal summary

Athletics

Men

Track Events

Field Events

Combined Events

Decathlon

Women

Track Events

Field Events

Combined Events

Heptathlon

Badminton

Basketball

Men's tournament

Roster

Preliminary Round

|}

9th-16th Place Quarterfinal

9th-12th Place Semifinal

9th Place Match

Women's tournament

Preliminary Round

|}

Quarterfinal

Semifinal

Gold Medal Match

Diving

Fencing

Gymnastics

Artistic

Team

Individual

Rhythmic

Judo

Swimming

Men

Women
{|class=wikitable style="font-size:90%"
|-
!rowspan="2"|Athlete
!rowspan="2"|Event
!colspan="2"|Heat
!colspan="2"|Semifinal
!colspan="2"|Final
|- style="font-size:95%"
!Time
!Rank
!Time
!Rank
!Time
!Rank
|- align=center
|align=left|Meg Elizabeth Bailey
|align=left|400m Individual Medley
|4:48.87
|5
|colspan=4|did not advance
|- align=center
|align=left rowspan=3|Hayley Victoria Baker
|align=left|200m Backstroke
|DNS
|N/A
|colspan=4|did not advance
|- align=center
|align=left|100m Backstroke
|1:01.33
|1Q
|1:02.19
|7
|colspan=2|did not advance
|- align=center
|align=left|50m Backstroke
|29.04
|5Q
|28.97
|7
|colspan=2|did not advance
|- align=center
|align=left rowspan=5|Gemma Jane Isab Cooney
|align=left|50m Butterfly
|27.68
|7
|colspan=4|did not advance
|- align=center
|align=left|100m Freestyle
|55.79
|5Q
|55.54
|7
|colspan=2|did not advance
|- align=center
|align=left|100m Butterfly
|1:00.06
|6Q
|59.77
|6
|colspan=2|did not advance
|- align=center
|align=left|200m Freestyle
|2:01.86
|5Q
|2:00.72
|6
|colspan=2|did not advance
|- align=center
|align=left|50m Freestyle
|26.13
|5
|colspan=4|did not advance
|- align=center
|align=left rowspan=4|Abbey Grace Harkin
|align=left|100m Breaststroke
|1:10.39
|4Q
|1:10.32
|8
|colspan=2|did not advance
|- align=center
|align=left|200m Individual Medley
|2:17.36
|4Q''
|2:16.98
|6
|colspan=2|did not advance
|- align=center
|align=left|200m Freestyle
|2:04.14
|7
|colspan=4|did not advance
|- align=center
|align=left|50m Freestyle
|26.63
|6
|colspan=4|did not advance
|- align=center
|align=left rowspan=3|Kareena Jane Lee
|align=left|1500m Freestyle
|16:46.63
|5
|colspan=4|did not advance
|- align=center
|align=left|800m Freestyle
|8:44.74
|6
|colspan=4|did not advance
|- align=center
|align=left|Marathon (10 km)
|colspan=4 
|DNS
|N/A
|- align=center
|align=left rowspan=4|Kiah Shenea Melverton
|align=left|400m Individual Medley
|4:47.41
|6
|colspan=4|did not advance
|- align=center
|align=left|1500m Freestyle
|16:24.95
|3Q|colspan=2 
|16:15.83
|4
|- align=center
|align=left|800m Freestyle
|8:36.21
|3Q|colspan=2 
|8:32.46
|4
|- align=center
|align=left|400m Freestyle
|4:12.33
|1Q|colspan=2 
|4:12.42
|6
|- align=center
|align=left rowspan=3|Leiston Jane Pickett
|align=left|100m Breaststroke
|1:08.94
|1Q|1:08.26
|2Q|1:08.21
|6
|- align=center
|align=left|200m Breaststroke
|2:34.83
|6
|colspan=4|did not advance
|- align=center
|align=left|50m Breaststroke
|31.31
|1Q|31.16
|1Q|30.82
|
|- align=center
|align=left rowspan=2|Laura Jane Taylor
|align=left|100m Freestyle
|56.38
|6
|colspan=4|did not advance
|- align=center
|align=left|200m Butterfly
|2:13.40
|1Q|2:11.79
|2Q|2:12.74
|8
|- align=center
|align=left rowspan=3|Emily Rachael Washer
|align=left|50m Butterfly
|27.39
|5Q|27.39
|8
|colspan=2|did not advance
|- align=center
|align=left|100m Butterfly
|1:01.73
|5
|colspan=4|did not advance
|- align=center
|align=left|200m Butterfly
|2:17.36
|6
|colspan=4|did not advance
|- align=center
|align=left rowspan=3|Sian Monique Whittaker
|align=left|200m Backstroke
|2:10.55
|2Q|2:10.10
|1Q|2:09.50
|
|- align=center
|align=left|100m Backstroke
|1:00.91
|2Q|1:00.53
|1Q|1:00.14
|
|- align=center
|align=left|Gemma Jane Isab CooneyAbbey Grace HarkinLaura Jane TaylorEmily Rachael WasherSian Monique Whittaker
|align=left|4x100m Freestyle Relay
|3:45.09
|4
|colspan=4|did not advance
|- align=center
|align=left|Hayley Victoria BakerAbbey Grace HarkinGemma Jane Isab CooneyLeiston Jane PickettSian Monique Whittaker
|align=left|4x100m Medley Relay
|4:05.10
|1Q|colspan=2 
|4:03.58
|4
|- align=center
|align=left|Gemma Jane Isab CooneyAbbey Grace HarkinKiah Shenea MelvertonLaura Jane Taylor
|align=left|4x200m Freestyle Relay
|8:04.52
|3Q|colspan=2 
|8:04.76
|7
|}

Table Tennis

Taekwondo

Tennis

Volleyball

Men's tournamentPreliminary Round|}

|}17th–22nd place quarterfinals|}17th–20th place semifinals|}19th place match|}

Water Polo

Men's tournamentPreliminary roundRound of 169th–16th place quarterfinals9th–12th place semifinals11th place matchWomen's tournamentPreliminary RoundQuarterfinals5th-8th semifinals5th place match'''

Weightlifting

Wushu

References

 Australia Overview

External links
Universiade Taipei 2017 

Nations at the 2017 Summer Universiade
Australia at the Summer Universiade
2017 in Australian sport